Sól may refer to:
Sól (Germanic mythology), a goddess who personifies the sun in Germanic mythology
Sól, Lublin Voivodeship, east Poland
Sól, Masovian Voivodeship, east-central Poland
Sól, Silesian Voivodeship, south Poland
Sowilo rune or Sól

See also
Sol (disambiguation)